Mixed martial arts (MMA) is a form of competitive combat sport, akin to boxing, muay thai, or kick boxing. MMA titles, or championship belts, are given to those fighters deemed by a promotional organization to have met a certain standard of athletic accomplishment in a specific weight class (most often by means of a championship fight). Championship belts are fought for at each weight class under a promotion, with only one belt awarded per class. Each belt is usually contested every time the belt holder fights, and passed to the victor of that fight (see the List of UFC champions for a chronology of UFC title belts). A belt may be vacated when a fighter leaves a promotion, or is suspended. At such times an interim champion may be crowned, or the belt may be awarded to the winner of a fight between top contenders.

This list displays all title holders for the major, certified MMA promoting and sanctioning bodies. There is no clear industry definition within the MMA community to determine which organizations are considered major promoting bodies. Due to a lack of clear guidelines, this list is limited to those organizations that are either highly regarded (such as the Ultimate Fighting Championship (UFC) and Strikeforce), long standing (such as King of the Cage (KOTC) and Pancrase), or the dominant organizations of a country or region of the world (such as England's Ultimate Challenge MMA (UCMMA) and Canada's Maximum Fighting Championship (MFC)).

Because there is no international unified MMA weight class system in use, the Nevada State Athletic Commission's (NSAC) weight classes have been adopted for this article as they are most common across major promotions. Some organizations have created titles in weight classes outside the NSAC guidelines. Those titles have been and will be recognized as subdivisions under their common weight class.

Though unofficial, Fight Matrix considered the first MMA lineal champions as follows:
 Heavyweight – Ken Shamrock beginning October 14, 1993 at Pancrase: Yes, We Are Hybrid Wrestlers 2
 Light heavyweight – Frank Shamrock beginning December 21, 1997 at UFC Japan: Ultimate Japan.
 Middleweight – Kenji Kawaguchi beginning May 18, 1989 at Shooto: Shooto.
 Welterweight – Yasuto Sekishima beginning January 13, 1990 at Shooto: Shooto.
 Lightweight – Yuichi Watanabe beginning January 13, 1990 at Shooto: Shooto.
 Featherweight – Noboru Asahi beginning March 27, 1992 at Shooto: Shooto.
 Bantamweight – Kazuhiro Sakamoto beginning October 19, 1989 at Shooto: Shooto.
 Flyweight – Kenji Ogusu beginning March 27, 1992 at Shooto: Shooto.
Although the inaugural lineal champions are sometimes contested, especially at heavyweight; the consensus view, is that all the lineal titles have been unified with their respective weight class UFC titles.

Organizations are listed by a combination of their size (number of fighters, events per year, etc.) and their history (years in existence, title lineage, etc.). Title holders from other organizations, who are now fighting in the UFC, are not included in this list as the UFC does not cross promote and these belts are often vacated.

Men

Heavyweight (265 lb, 120 kg)

Cruiserweight (225 lb, 102 kg)

Light Heavyweight (205 lb, 93 kg)

Middleweight (185 lb, 84 kg)

Welterweight (170 lb, 77 kg or 175 lb, 79 kg)

Light Welterweight (165 lb, 75 kg)

Lightweight (155 lb, 70 kg)

Featherweight (145 lb, 66 kg)

Bantamweight (135 lb, 61 kg)

Flyweight (125 lb, 57 kg)

Strawweight (115 lb, 52 kg)

Women
Women athletes are generally smaller than, and compete at lower weights than their male counterparts.

Featherweight (145 lb, 66 kg)

Bantamweight (135 lb, 61 kg)

Flyweight (125 lb, 57 kg)

Strawweight (115 lb, 52 kg)

Super Atomweight (108 lb, 49 kg)

Atomweight (105 lb, 47,5 kg)

Microweight (95 lb, 43 kg)

See also

 List of current world boxing champions
 List of current female boxing champions
 List of undefeated mixed martial artists
 Double champions in MMA

References

Mixed martial arts champions
Champions